Kuh Pas (also Romanized as Kūh Pas; also known as Kupys) is a village in Deylaman Rural District, Deylaman District, Siahkal County, Gilan Province, Iran. At the 2006 census, its population was 1500, in 300families.

References 

Populated places in Siahkal County